The Battle of Norfleet House took place from April 13 to April 15, 1863, as part of the Siege of Suffolk.

Battle
In cooperation with Major General D. H. Hill's advance on Washington, North Carolina, Longstreet with divisions under Major Generals John Bell Hood and George Pickett besieged the Union garrison at Suffolk commanded by Brigadier General John J. Peck. The Union works were formidable and manned by 25,000 men, opposed to Longstreet's 20,000. On April 13, the Confederate troops pushed their left flank to the Nansemond River and constructed a battery on Hill's Point, which closed off the garrison to Union shipping. The Federals, at the same time, constructed batteries to command the Confederate works at Norfleet House. On April 15, these batteries were unmasked and opened fire, driving the Confederates out of this important position.

References

External links
 National Park Service battle description
 CWSAC Report Update
 Official Records

1863 in Virginia
April 1863 events
Battles of the Eastern Theater of the American Civil War
Battles of Longstreet's Tidewater Campaign of the American Civil War
Conflicts in 1863
Inconclusive battles of the American Civil War
Suffolk, Virginia